Better Days is the fourth studio album by American R&B singer Joe. It was released by Jive Records on December 11, 2001, in the United States. The album reached number 32 on the US Billboard 200 and number four on the Top R&B/Hip-Hop Albums chart. It spawned three singles, including "Lets Stay Home Tonight", which reached number 18 on the US R&B chart; "What If a Woman", which reached number 13 on the US R&B chart, and "Isn't This the World". Better Days became Joe's second album to receive a Grammy Award nomination in the Best R&B Album category, while "Let's Stay Home Tonight" was nominated for the Grammy Award for Best Male R&B Vocal Performance. On August 7, 2002, a Japanese limited version of the album was released together with "Joe Video Collection: I Wanna Know and More Video" content, named "Better Days & The Video Collection".

Critical reception

AllMusic's Jason Birchmeier praised "Let's Stay Home Tonight" and "Ghetto Child" as highlights and Joe for carrying the record, but was critical of the track listing repeating various "songwriting techniques" and love story "motifs", concluding that "if you're looking for a few quality singles rather than a consistent album, you should find this to be an engaging album, even if its rushed and ultimately thin on original ideas." Vibe contributor Dimitri Ehrlich gave praise to Joe's musical inventiveness in utilizing instrumentation, "lyrical wit" and telling stories from a woman's perspective, concluding with: "Better Days is mostly a one-man show, a nice surprise in an era when few artists seem brave enough to resist all-star guests."

Track listing

Sample credits
 "Better Days" contains a portion of "O-o-h Child" written by Stan Vincent, performed by the Five Stairsteps.
 "Isn't This the World" contains portions of "Theme from Close Encounters of the Third Kind" by John Williams.
 "Here She Comes" contains a portion of "Maneater" written by Daryl Hall, John Oates and Sara Allen, performed by Hall & Oates.

Personnel
Credits adapted from the liner notes of Better Days.

Musicians
 Marlene Rice – violin 
 Nioka Workman – cello 
 Judith Insell-Staack – viola 
 Hart Hollman and The Motown Romance Orchestra – orchestra 
 The Lord's Church Children's Cathedral Choir – choir 

Production
 Andy Brooks – assistant engineer 
 Steef Van DeGevel – assistant engineer 
 Tim Roberts – assistant engineer 
 Tony Flores – assistant engineer 
 Allen "Allstar" Gordon – mixing 
 Andy Blakelock – mixing 
 Stephen George – mixing 
 Serban Ghenea – mixing 
 Peter Mokran – mixing 
 Tom Coyne – mastering 

Imagery
 Denise Trotman – art direction and design
 Jonathan Mannion – photography
 Wendall Haskins – stylist
 Andrea Richter – grooming

Charts

Weekly charts

Year-end charts

Certifications

References

2001 albums
Joe (singer) albums
Jive Records albums
Albums produced by the Neptunes
Albums recorded at Electric Lady Studios
Albums recorded at MSR Studios